Corn-fed, Corn fed, or Cornfed may refer to:
Corn-fed beef, beef from cattle that is raised on corn (maize) rather than pasture.

Comics and animation
Corn Fed Comics, an underground comix by Kim Deitch
"Cornfed", an android character from the Livewires comic book limited series
"Cornfed", a pig from the Duckman animated sitcom

Other
Corn-Fed:Cul-de-sacs, Keg Stands, and Coming of Age in the Midwest, a 2018 humor memoir by Melanie LaForce
 Corn Fed (album), a 2006 album by Shannon Brown
 Cornfed Derby Dames, a women's flat track roller derby league in Muncie, Indiana, United States